Francis Lowe may refer to:

Sir Francis Lowe, 1st Baronet (1852–1929), British Conservative Party politician
Sir Gordon Lowe (Francis Gordon Lowe, 1884–1972), English tennis player, son of the above

See also
Frank Lowe, American saxophonist
Frank Lowe (advertiser)